Parkins Mills is an unincorporated community in Frederick County, Virginia. Parkins Mills lies southeast of Winchester on the Front Royal Pike (U.S. Route 522) at Opequon Creek.

Historic Landmarks -

Parkins Mill Battery- Used During the Civil War 
To defend Winchester And Opequon Creek 
located On The Hill Overlooking Front Royal Pike and West Parkins Mill Road  
On Fort Hill Farm Property

References

Unincorporated communities in Frederick County, Virginia
Unincorporated communities in Virginia